InfrastructureUSA is a non-profit online community that advocates for comprehensive infrastructure investment in the United States. InfrastructureUSA is a non-profit project fiscally sponsored by FJC, A Foundation of Philanthropic Funds.

Site Content

InfrastructureUSA's web content is largely divided into four sections: The Infra Blog, Infra Views, Show Us Your Infra and Infra Polls.

The Infra Blog 
Offers original content, opinion pieces, and interviews with national infrastructure figures. The interviews are published as audio clips and a downloadable transcript.

Subjects include:
U.S. Secretary of Transportation Anthony Foxx
U.S. Secretary of Energy Dr. Ernest Moniz
Former Governor Ed Rendell
U.S. Representative Richard L. Hanna 
American Association of State Highway and Transportation Officials (AASHTO) Executive Director Frederick "Bud" Wright.
Transportation for America Director James Corless
Laborers’ International Union of North America (LIUNA) General President Terry O’Sullivan
American Council of Engineering Companies (ACEC) President & CEO David Raymond
Smart Growth America President and CEO Geoffrey Anderson
Harvard Business School Professor Rosabeth Moss Kanter
Former U.S. Secretary of Transportation Ray LaHood
Former U.S. Secretary of Transportation Norman Mineta
Former House Transportation and Infrastructure Committee Chairman John Mica
National Urban League President Marc Morial
Federal Transit Administration (FTA) Acting Administrator Therese W. McMillan
Urban Land Institute CEO Patrick L. Phillips
League of American Bicyclists President Andy Clarke
Next American City Executive Director Diana Lind
American Road and Transportation Builders Association (ARTBA) President Pete Ruane

Infra Views 
Infra Views aggregates reports and studies from hundreds of think tanks, advocacy groups, trade and professional associations and government agencies. Much of the content is available as an excerpt online, with an option to download the full version as a PDF.

Show Us Your Infra! 
Showcases visual-based media from external sources like Flickr, YouTube and Vimeo
Anyone can create a username and post directly to the Show Us Your Infra! page

Infra Polls 
Poses questions related to infrastructure with several possible responses. Users "vote" for an answer, and the current tally is displayed as a bar graph.

Funding
Primary seed funding for InfrastructureUSA comes from: American Council of Engineering Companies (ACEC), American Society of Civil Engineers (ASCE), AECOM, New York Building Foundation, John Hennessy III, P.E., and Anderson Productions Ltd.

External links 
 InfrastructureUSA Homepage
 FJC, A Foundation of Philanthropic Funds

References

American political websites